Lebanon competed at the 2018 Winter Olympics in Pyeongchang, South Korea, from 9 to 25 February 2018, with three competitors in two sports.

Competitors
The following is the list of number of competitors participating in the delegation per sport.

Alpine skiing 

Lebanon qualified two alpine skiers, one male and one female.

Cross-country skiing 

Lebanon qualified one male cross-country skier. This will mark the country's first participation in the sport since 1956.

Distance

See also
Lebanon at the 2017 Asian Winter Games
Lebanon at the 2018 Summer Youth Olympics

References

Nations at the 2018 Winter Olympics
2018
2018 in Lebanese sport